Agna is a town and commune in the province of Padua, in the Veneto region of northern Italy.

References

Cities and towns in Veneto